Eucalyptus pauciflora subsp. debeuzevillei, commonly known as Jounama snow gum, is a mallee or small tree that is native to a few mountain peaks in south-eastern Australia. It has smooth, shiny bark, glossy green lance-shaped to egg-shaped leaves, flower buds in groups of between nine and fifteen, white flowers and hemispherical or conical fruit. It differs from other subspecies of E. pauciflora in having angular flower buds.

Description
The branchlets are usually glaucous. The bark is smooth, grey, white, cream-coloured or light brown and often has insect scribbles. Flowering has been recorded in December and January and the flowers are white. Subspecies debeuzevillei differs from others in the species in having mature buds that are strongly angular.

Taxonomy and naming
Eucalyptus debeuzevillei was first formally described in 1920 by Joseph Maiden in the Journal and Proceedings of the Royal Society of New South Wales, from material collected by Wilfred Alexander de Beuzeville. In 1973, Lawrie Johnson and Donald Blaxell reduced the species to a subspecies of E. pauciflora as E. pauciflora subsp. debeuzevillei. 
The epithet (debeuzevillei) presumably honours the collector of the type.

Distribution and habitat
This subspecies occurs on the highest peaks south from Mount Franklin in the Australian Capital Territory to near Yarrangobilly in New South Wales and Mount Buffalo in Victoria.

References

pauciflora
Flora of Victoria (Australia)
Plants described in 1920
Flora of New South Wales